The Anaheim Ducks are a professional ice hockey team based in Anaheim, California, USA. They are members of the Pacific Division of the Western Conference of the National Hockey League (NHL). The team was founded as an expansion franchise in 1993 as the Mighty Ducks of Anaheim. At the end of the 2018–19 season, 390 players, 31 goaltenders and 359 skaters (forwards and defenseman), have played at least one game for Ducks in the regular or post-season.

Key
  Appeared in a Ducks game during the 2021–22 season.
  Stanley Cup Champion, Hockey Hall of Famer, or retired number.

The "Seasons" column lists the first year of the season of the player's first game and the last year of the season of the player's last game. For example, a player who played one game in the 2000–2001 season would be listed as playing with the team from 2000–2001, regardless of what calendar year the game occurred within.

Statistics complete as of the 2021–22 NHL season.

Goaltenders

Skaters

Notes
a: As of the 2005–2006 NHL season, all games will have a winner, teams losing in overtime and shootouts are awarded one point thus the OTL stat replacees the tie statistic. The OTL column also includes SOL (Shootout losses).

References
General

Specific

Anaheim

players